Nușeni is a commune in Bistrița-Năsăud County, Transylvania, Romania. It is composed of seven villages: Beudiu (Bőd), Dumbrava (Nyírmezőtanya), Feleac (Fellak), Malin (Almásmálom), Nușeni, Rusu de Sus (Felsőoroszfalu), and Vița (Vice).

The commune lies on the Transylvanian Plateau, on the banks of the river Meleș, a left tributary of the river Someșul Mare.

Nușeni's neighbors are the town of Beclean to the north, Unguraș commune in Cluj County to the west, Chiochiș commune to the south, Matei and Lechința communes to the southeast, and Șieu-Odorhei commune to the east. 

At the 2011 census, 74.4% of inhabitants were Romanians, 25% Hungarians, and 0.5% Roma.

Natives
Dumitru Sigmirean

References

Communes in Bistrița-Năsăud County
Localities in Transylvania